Georg Hille (born 28 December 1923) is a Norwegian clergyman. He served as bishop of the Diocese of Hamar from 1974 to 1993.

Hille was born in Varteig as the son of bishop Henrik Greve Hille, and grandson of Arnoldus Hille. He graduated as cand.theol. from the University of Oslo in 1950. He was priest in Bergen from 1956 to 1957, in Oslo from 1957 to 1963, and in Lom from 1963 to 1971. From 1974 to 1993 he served as bishop of the Diocese of Hamar.

References

1923 births
Living people
People from Sarpsborg
20th-century Norwegian Lutheran clergy
Bishops of Hamar
University of Oslo alumni